The 2019 FIBA Africa U16 Championship for Women was the 6th FIBA Africa U16 Championship for Women, played under the rules of FIBA, the world governing body for basketball, and the FIBA Africa thereof. The tournament was hosted by Rwanda from 26 July to 4 August, with the games played in Kigali. The top two teams qualified for the 2020 FIBA U17 Women's Basketball World Cup in Romania.

Venue

References

External links
Official Website

FIBA Africa Under-16 Championship for Women
2019 in African basketball
2019 in women's basketball
FIBA
FIBA U16
International basketball competitions hosted by Rwanda
July 2019 sports events in Africa
August 2019 sports events in Africa